is a video game developed by Yuke's and published by Sony Computer Entertainment for the PlayStation. It was released in Japan in September 1995.

Gameplay 

The game features extensive use of parallax scrolling.

The player can collect stars throughout the level. These stars act as the life meter (somewhat like Sonic the Hedgehog). After 100 stars have been collected, they can be used to hatch eggs. Eggs turn into animal assistants such as chickens, dragons, penguins or turtles. Different colored eggs will turn into different animals. These assistants can aid the player by shooting, or flying, and the player can have a maximum of three animal assistants at any time.
They evolved at: 
                Chicken 100 500 1500 star
                Dragon  100 1600 4000 star
                Penguin 100 800 2000 star
                Turtle  100 1000 3000 star

If the player collects 400 stars, they can get a new life.

In some stage, it may had more than one path to end that stage and each path will lead you to next stage or some hidden stage, shortcut.

Enemies in the game include mutant, ex: car tire, shoe, pin, lighters, bubbleman,.... and some stage will had BOSS.

Plot 
The story follows the eponymous Hermie as he witnesses an egg leap out of a trashcan and, peering inside said receptacle, falls into an alternate dimension.

Development and release 

Hermie Hopperhead: Scrap Panic was developed by Yuke's. The game was released on September 29, 1995, for the PlayStation by Sony Computer Entertainment. It was re-released under The Best for Family budget range on December 6, 1996. Hermie Hopperhead has not been available on the Japanese PlayStation Store.

Reception 

Famitsu 24/40.

Mega Fun 61.

Maniac gave it a 66%.

GameFan 84.

Super Game Power gave it an overall score of 4.5 out of 5 and called it a fun game in the style of Mario Bros.

Super Console gave it a score of 89%.

Play 53%.

PlayStation Power gave it just 20%.

Consoles + gave it 90%.

Notes

References

External links 
 Hermie Hopperhead: Scrap Panic at GameFAQs
 Hermie Hopperhead: Scrap Panic at Giant Bomb
 Hermie Hopperhead: Scrap Panic at MobyGames

1995 video games
Japan-exclusive video games
PlayStation (console)-only games
PlayStation (console) games
Side-scrolling platform games
Single-player video games
Sony Interactive Entertainment games
Video games developed in Japan
Yuke's games